The Sony Clie TJ series were mid-range personal digital assistants produced by Sony, running the Palm operating system (version 5).

PEG-TJ35 & PEG-TJ25 

The Sony CLIÉ PEG-TJ35 and PEG-TJ25 were released by Sony in 2003. These models are identical, except the TJ-35 also offers MP3 and ATRAC playback capabilities with a headphone jack. Powered by an ARM iMX-1 processor at 200 MHz, these devices ran the Palm OS 5 platform, featuring 32MB of internal storage (23M available for user data), as well as a Memory Stick PRO slot for additional storage expansion. Synchronization via USB and Infrared is also possible. The case of these devices appears to be aluminium, but is actually a painted plastic enclosure, with an internal steel plate providing structural rigidity. At the time or release, these devices competed with the PalmOne Zire 71. While navigation on these devices could be performed using the touchscreen, as was common for many Clie models, these devices also featured a scrolling wheel offering easy one-handed vertical navigation, which could be pressed in to select items.

Included Software 
The device comes with a few applications:

In ROM 
 Address Book
 AeroPlayer (Version 1.0S) - A MP3 player.
 Calculator
 Calendar
 CLIÉ Files
 CLIÉ Image Viewer (Version 1.2)
 CLIÉ Launcher
 CLIÉ Memo
 Data Export (Version 1.0)
 Date Book
 Decuma handwriting recognition
 Graffiti 2 handwriting system
 HotSync
 Memo Pad
 Note Pad
 Pixel Viewer. An application to view Microsoft Word, Excel and PowerPoint documents, or PDF and HTML files.
 Preferences
 To Do List

A bundle of trial software versions are also available on Installation CD-ROM.

Installation CD-ROM

PC 
 Palm Desktop v.4.1
 Adobe Acrobat
 Image Converter
 Intellisync Lite for syncing to Outlook.
 QuickTime

Palm 
 Agendus (Trial)
 BDicty (Trial)
 London Tube Guide (Trial)
 Paris Metro Guide (Trial)
 Kickoo's Breakout (Trial)
 Kickoo's TakTik (Trial)
 Bump Attack Pinball (Trial)
 ViaMichelin (Trial)

Multimedia

Music 
MP3s can be played from Memory Stick/Memory Stick PRO using the skinable AeroPlayer. Files must be stored in /PALM/Programs/MSAUDIO  directory on the Memory Stick. MP3s with bit rates from 96 kbit/s - 320 kbit/s will be played.

Additional codecs to support Speex or Vorbis were available  for free.

Video
TCPMP could be used to watch Videos on this device. The files can only be played from Memory Stick/Memory Stick PRO.

PEG-TJ37 & PEG-TJ27 
The Sony CLIÉ PEG-TJ37 and PEG-TJ27 were released in early 2004, and improved upon the previous models with the addition of an integrated digital camera, complete with dedicated shutter button, and a manual sliding lens cover. The camera featured VGA (640x480, 0.31MP) resolution, and was only capable of taking still photographs. Like the previous models, the higher-end TJ37 also included MP3 playback capabilities, but now also added Wi-Fi for mobile internet access. Most other features and specifications remained the same as per the previous generation.

External links 
 Updates

References 

TJ35
Sony products
Palm OS devices